Jakubovice is a municipality and village in Šumperk District in the Olomouc Region of the Czech Republic. It has about 200 inhabitants. The village is well preserved and is protected by law as a village monument zone.

References

Villages in Šumperk District